II Rhythmic Gymnastics World Championships were held in Prague, Czechoslovakia on 3 and 4 December 1965.

Participants
There were 32 competitors from 12 countries - Soviet Union, Czechoslovakia, Bulgaria, German Democratic Republic, Federal Republic of Germany, Hungary, Poland, Yugoslavia, Finland, Cuba, Belgium & Austria.

Results
Competitors competed in two events - freehand and with apparatus. Routines were marked out of 20.

Medal table

Freehand

Apparatus

All-Around

External links
Results

Rhythmic Gymnastics World Championships
World Rhythmic Gymnastics Championships
Sports competitions in Prague
1965 in Czechoslovak sport
International gymnastics competitions hosted by Czechoslovakia
1960s in Prague
December 1965 sports events in Europe